The 1998 Maryland gubernatorial election was held on November 3, 1998. Incumbent Democratic Governor Parris Glendening sought re-election. Governor Glendening emerged victorious from the Democratic primary after defeating several candidates. Former State Delegate Ellen Sauerbrey, who was the 1994 Republican nominee for governor, ran again for governor and won her party's nomination. The election between Glendening and Sauerbrey four years prior was extremely contentious, and ended with the Sauerbrey campaign challenging the results. Ultimately, despite the controversial nature of the previous election, Governor Glendening comfortably beat back Sauerbrey's spirited challenge, winning his second and final term as governor. , this was the last time that Allegany County voted Democratic in a gubernatorial election.

Democratic primary

Candidates
Lawrence K. Freeman, Lyndon LaRouche activist and perennial candidate
Parris Glendening, incumbent Governor of Maryland
Terence McGuire, physician
Eileen M. Rehrmann, Harford County Executive

Withdrew 

 Ray Schoenke, Insurance executive retired professional football player

Results

Republican primary

Candidates
Charles I. Ecker, Howard County Executive
Ellen Sauerbrey, former State Delegate and nominee for governor in 1994

General election

Results

References 

Gubernatorial
Maryland
1998